Pammene clanculana is a moth belonging to the family Tortricidae. The species was first described by Johan Martin Jakob von Tengström in 1869.

It is native to Northern Europe.

References

Grapholitini